The following is a timeline of the history of the city of Sarajevo, Bosnia and Herzegovina.

Prior to 15th century

15th–18th centuries

 1457 - Emperor's Mosque built.
 1463 - Settlements begin in Sarajevo.
 1521 - Gazi Husrev-beg becomes sanjak-bey of Ottoman Bosnian Sanjak.
 1530 - Gazi Husrev-beg Mosque built.
 1531 - Madrasah of Sarajevo established.
 1561 - Ali Pasha's Mosque built.
 1697 - City sacked by Austrian forces.
 1703 - Seat of Ottoman Bosnia Eyalet relocated from Sarajevo to Travnik.
 1730 - Serbian Orthodox church rebuilt.
 1739 - Fortress restored.
 1766 - Magribija rebuilt.
 1788 - Fire.
 1791 - November: Flood.
 1797 - Fire.
 1798 - Latin Bridge rebuilt.

19th century

 1813 - Plague.
 1850 - Seat of Ottoman Bosnia Eyalet relocated to Sarajevo from Travnik.
 1851 - Population: 21,102.
 1867 - City becomes capital of the Ottoman Bosnia Vilayet.
 1868 - Serb Orthodox Cathedral built.
 1869 - Orphanage founded.
 1878 - City becomes part the Condominium of Bosnia and Herzegovina of Austria-Hungary.
 1879 - Fire.
 1885 - Population: 26,377.
 1888 - National Museum established.
 1889 - Sacred Heart Cathedral built.
 1893 - Mehmed-beg Kapetanović Ljubušak becomes mayor.
 1894 - National Museum buys Sephardic Haggadah for its collection.
 1895 - Population: 37,713.
 1896 - Town Hall and National Library built.

20th century

 1902 - Sarajevo Synagogue built.
 1906 - Novibazar-Sarajevo railway begins operating.
 1910 - Population: 51,919.
 1912 - Kino Apolo (cinema) opens.
 1913 - National Museum built.
 1914
 28 June: Assassination of Archduke Franz Ferdinand of Austria.
 28–29 June: Anti-Serb pogrom in Sarajevo.
 1915 - Kino Imperijal (cinema) opens.
 1918 - City becomes part of the Kingdom of Serbs, Croats and Slovenes.
 1921 - Population: 60,087.
 1923 - Sarajevo Philharmonic Orchestra active.
 1929 - City becomes seat of the Drina Banovina (province) of Yugoslavia.
 1930 - Art gallery established.
 1935 - Kino Tesla (cinema) opens.
 1941 - German occupation begins.
 1943 - Oslobođenje newspaper begins publication.
 1945
 April: German occupation ends.
 State School of Painting, and Association of Artists of Bosnia and Herzegovina established.
 1949 - University of Sarajevo and Museum of Sarajevo established.
 1950 - Oriental Institute in Sarajevo established.
 1953 - Population: 135,657.
 1961 - Population: 213,092.
 1969 - Skenderija (event centre) built.
 1962 - June: Earthquake.
 1972 - Academy of Arts opens.
 1977 - Faculty of Islamic Theology established.
 1981
 Academy of Performing Arts in Sarajevo established.
 Vraca Memorial Park opens.
 Emerik Blum becomes mayor.
 Population: 319,017.
 1984
 February: 1984 Winter Olympics.
 Sarajevo Winter Festival begins.
 1991 - Population: 361,735; canton 527,049.
 1992
 5 April: Siege of Sarajevo begins.
 2–3 May: 1992 Yugoslav People's Army column incident in Sarajevo.
 17 May: Oriental Institute in Sarajevo destroyed.
 Sarajevo War Theatre opens.
 BH Dani magazine begins publication.
 1995
 Canton of Sarajevo established per Dayton Agreement.
 Dnevni avaz newspaper in publication.
 Sarajevo Film Festival begins.
 Mediacentar Sarajevo founded.
 1996 - 29 February: Siege of Sarajevo ends.
 1997 - Sarajevo Jazz Festival begins.
 2000 - King Fahd Mosque inaugurated.

21st century

 2001 - Istiqlal Mosque and Bosniak Institute established.
 2002 - Population: 401,118.
 2004
 Center for Investigative Reporting headquartered in city.
 Baitus Salam (mosque) built.
 2005
 Semiha Borovac becomes mayor.
 East West Theatre Company founded.
 2008
 Avaz Twist Tower built.
 Sarajevo City Center (commercial space) construction begins.
 2009
 Alija Behmen becomes mayor.
 BBI Centar shopping mall in business.
 2013
 Ivo Komšić becomes mayor.
 Population: 369,534; metro 515,012.
 2014 -  opens.
 2014
 April 2014: Sarajevo City Center opened early
 April 2014: Miljacka River almost flooded the city 
 9 May: Sarajevo National Library reopens.
 2017
 6 February: Abdulah Skaka becomes mayor.
 2019
 Summer 2019 - Sarajevo flooded by high amount of rain due to overwhelming humidity climate.
 November 2019 - Sarajevo faced 3 aftershocks of an Earthquake with its epicenter in Nevesinje, it is referred to as the Durrës Earthquake.
 2020
 January 2020 - Sarajevo faces a dangerous air pollution similar to most Chinese urban cities
 March 2020 - COVID-19 impacts the education and movement in Sarajevo.
 22 March 2020 - A weak aftershock occurred exactly at 6:25 AM (CET) from an earthquake in Zagreb.
 29 December 2020 - Another weak aftershock occurred at 12:20 PM (CET) from an earthquake in Petrinja.
 2021
 8 April: Benjamina Karić becomes mayor.

See also
List of mayors of Sarajevo since 1878
Other names of Sarajevo

References

This article incorporates information from the German Wikipedia and Serbian Wikipedia.

Bibliography

Published in the 19th century

Published in the 20th century

 

 (Published in Serbian?)

 (Published in Serbian?)
  (Sarajevo in the 18th century by contemporary )

Published in the 21st century

External links

Europeana. Items related to Sarajevo, various dates.

Years in Bosnia and Herzegovina
 
Sarajevo
sarajevo
Sarajevo